Hambardzum Manvel Terteryan was born in 1884. He got a Law Degree, was the leader of the ARF in Nor Nakhichevan. 
He has been a member of the National Assembly of Armenia since June 1919.
In the summer of 1920, Terteryan participated in Armenian-Russian negotiations held in Moscow and Yerevan.
From November 24 to December 2, 1920 he occupied the positions of the Minister of Finance of the Republic of Armenia, and the acting Minister of Reconstruction and Public Assistance.

References 

1884 births
Armenian Revolutionary Federation politicians
People of the First Republic of Armenia
Finance ministers of Armenia
Year of death missing
Ministers of Social Protection of the First Republic of Armenia